Krzysztof Stelmach (born 11 November 1967) is a Polish professional volleyball coach and former player. He was a member of the Poland national team from 1987 to 1997, and a participant in the Olympic Games Atlanta 1996.

Personal life
He has a younger brother Andrzej, who is a former volleyball player and coach. His nephew Kacper was also a professional volleyball player.

Career as coach
During the 2015–16 PlusLiga season he served as head coach for BBTS Bielsko-Biała. In 2016, he became Philippe Blain's assistant in PGE Skra Bełchatów.

Honours

Clubs
 National championships
 1989/1990  Polish Championship, with AZS Częstochowa
 2005/2006  Polish Cup, with BOT Skra Bełchatów
 2005/2006  Polish Championship, with BOT Skra Bełchatów
 2006/2007  Polish Cup, with BOT Skra Bełchatów
 2006/2007  Polish Championship, with BOT Skra Bełchatów
 2007/2008  Polish Championship, with PGE Skra Bełchatów

Universiade
 1991  Summer Universiade 
 1993  Summer Universiade

Individual awards
 2006: Polish Cup – Most Valuable Player

References

External links

 
 
 Player profile at LegaVolley.it 
 Player profile at PlusLiga.pl 
 Player profile at Volleybox.net

1967 births
Living people
People from Świebodzice
Polish men's volleyball players
Olympic volleyball players of Poland
Volleyball players at the 1996 Summer Olympics
Polish volleyball coaches
Polish expatriate sportspeople in Italy
Expatriate volleyball players in Italy
AZS Częstochowa players
Skra Bełchatów players
ZAKSA Kędzierzyn-Koźle coaches
AZS Olsztyn coaches
BBTS Bielsko-Biała coaches
AZS Częstochowa coaches
Stal Nysa coaches
Gwardia Wrocław coaches
Outside hitters